The 2TE116 is a broad gauge double diesel locomotive manufactured by Luhanskteplovoz, used extensively to haul heavy freight trains in the Soviet Union and its successor states, particularly by RŽD.

Variants are still being sold by Transmash; Ulanbataar Railway placed an order for 35 in October 2010.

The 2TE25 is a successor.

See also
 The Museum of the Moscow Railway, at Paveletsky Rail Terminal, Moscow
 Rizhsky Rail Terminal, Home of the Moscow Railway Museum
 Varshavsky Rail Terminal, St.Petersburg, Home of the Central Museum of Railway Transport, Russian Federation
 History of rail transport in Russia

References

Railway locomotives introduced in 1971
Co-Co+Co-Co locomotives
Diesel-electric locomotives of Ukraine
Diesel-electric locomotives of the Soviet Union
Luhanskteplovoz locomotives
5 ft gauge locomotives